Tommaso Giacomel (born 5 April 2000) is an Italian biathlete residing in Imer, Italy. He has competed in the Biathlon World Cup since 2019.

Career

2017-2019: Junior and Youth competitions
Giacomel made is international biathlon debut on December 9, 2017 in the Biathlon Junior World Cup stage in Obertilliach. He finished 5th in the Junior Men 10 km Sprint, missing ones in both prone and stand shooting. He later placed 13th in the second Junior Men sprint competition in the same venue.
In March of 2018, he competed in the Biathlon Junior World Championships 2017 in the Youth category and placed 2nd in the Sprint, 6th in the Pursuit, 4th in the Men's Relay and 22nd in the Individual.
The following year, he competed in the Biathlon Junior World Championships 2018 - he placed 35th in the Individual, 12th in the Sprint, 4th in the Pursuit, and 3rd in the Men's relay.
Later than season, he had mixed results in other Junior competitions - incluing placing 2nd in the Sjusjøen Junior World Cup Men's Sprint and 3rd in the Junior European Championship Men's Sprint.

2019-2020: IBU cup, World cup debut
In the Martell-Val Martello stage of the Biathlon Junior World Cup, he placed 3rd in the Sprint and 1st in the Pursuit - winning his first international gold medal. He 6th in the Biathlon Junior World Championships 2020, in the Junior Men 10km Sprint competition. Following his success in the Junior field, he made his 2019–20 Biathlon IBU Cup debut on 13 February 2020 in Martell-Val Martello, in the Qualifier round for the Men's Super Sprint, where he placed 73rd. Later that week he placed 49th in the Sprint and 21st in the Pursuit competitions.
Giacomel made his Biathlon World Cup debut just two weeks later, in Nove Mesto na Morave, where he shot clean and placed 27th - the highest ranking Italian of that day. He later placed 6th in the Men's Relay.
He finished the season ranking 56th in the Sprint and 39th in the Pursuit competitions in Kontiolahti, as the season was cup short by the COVID-19 pandemic.

2020-2021: Italian World Cup team
Although he was still eligable to compete in the Junior championships, Giacomel competed the 2020–21 Biathlon World Cup season in the elite circuit, replacing Patrick Braunhofer as a representative of the Italian team starting in Oberhof. He placed 42nd in the Sprint and 34th in the Pursuit in the first week of competitions, and won his first World cup medal as the Italian team ranked 3rd in the Men's Relay on the following week.
In the Biathlon World Championships 2021, he placed 70th in the Individual and 6th in the Men's relay.
Later that season, in Nove Mesto na Morave, he was chosen to compete the Single Mixed Relay with Michela Carrara and placed 16th.

2021-2022: First Olympics
Giacomel placed 95th in his first competition in the 2021–22 Biathlon World Cup, after missing 8 times in the individual. He then placed 42nd, 2nd among the Italians, in the Sprint competition.
On the following week, he placed 7th in the Östersund Men's pursuit - his career best, missing once and gaining 19 places.
His results towards the 2022 Winter Olympics were underwhelming, but he was neverteless selected for the Italian team - placing 61th in the Sprint competition and 7th in the Mens' relay.
In Otepää, he competed in his first Mass Start competition and placed 21th.
On the last week of the season, in Östersund, he placed 14th in the Sprint, 22nd in the Pursuit, and 27th in the Mass Start.

Record

Overall Record

Individual podiums
 0 victories – (2 Sp, 1 Pu)
 1 podiums

References

External links

2000 births
Living people
Sportspeople from Sterzing
Italian male biathletes
Biathletes at the 2022 Winter Olympics
Olympic biathletes of Italy
Biathlon World Championships medalists